Notable events in American soccer during the 1870s.

1870

International matches 
No international matches were played during the 1870 calendar year.

Club matches 
The following are known American soccer club matches that were played in 1870.

Source: SoccerStats.us

1871

International matches 
No international matches were played during the 1871 calendar year.

Club matches 
The following are known American soccer club matches that were played in 1871.

1872

International matches 
No international matches were played during the 1871 calendar year.

Club matches 
The following are known American soccer club matches that were played in 1872.

1873

International matches 
No international matches were played during the 1871 calendar year.

Club matches 
The following are known American soccer club matches that were played in 1873.

1874

International matches 
No international matches were played during the 1871 calendar year.

Club matches 
The following are known American soccer club matches that were played in 1874.

1875

International matches 
No international matches were played during the 1871 calendar year.

Club matches 
The following are known American soccer club matches that were played in 1875.

1876

International matches 
No international matches were played during the 1871 calendar year.

Club matches 
The following are known American soccer club matches that were played in 1876.

1877

International matches 
No international matches were played during the 1871 calendar year.

Club matches 
The following are known American soccer club matches that were played in 1877.

1878

International matches 
No international matches were played during the 1871 calendar year.

Club matches 
The following are known American soccer club matches that were played in 1878.

1879

International matches 
No international matches were played during the 1871 calendar year.

Club matches 
The following are known American soccer club matches that were played in 1879.

References 
General
 General overview of this time area sourced to:  
 1870 results sourced to: 
 1871 results sourced to: 
 1872 results sourced to: 
 1873 results sourced to: 
 1874 results sourced to: 
 1875 results sourced to: 
 1876 results sourced to: 
 1877 results sourced to: 
 1878 results sourced to: 
 1879 results sourced to: 
Notes

1870–1879